Magik is the title given to a trance mix-compilation series by Tiësto. The series, which has had seven installments starting in 1997 and ending in 2001, has been released by Tiësto on Black Hole Recordings. Tiësto released his own Artist Profile Series DJ Mix in 2000 with Magik Four: A New Adventure; Black Hole CD 07 is the only CD which is also released in the Artist Profile Series, after the four first Magik CDs were re-released in 2000 with new artwork. The sleeves on the first copies were replaced because of unauthorized use of Patrick Woodroffe's artwork.

Installments
There have been seven installments in the Magik series.
 Magik One: First Flight (September 15, 1997)
 Magik Two: Story of the Fall (May 8, 1998)
 Magik Three: Far from Earth (October 14, 1998)
 Magik Four: A New Adventure (June 6, 1999)
 Magik Five: Heaven Beyond (February 3, 2000)
 Magik Six: Live in Amsterdam (July 17, 2000)
 Magik Seven: Live in Los Angeles (May 17, 2001)

References

DJ mix album series